PD1 may refer to:

 Prussian S 3 a 19th-century steam locomotive
 PD-1 the Programmed cell death protein 1 receptor